(The Poor Mouth) is a 1941 novel in Irish by Brian O'Nolan (Flann O'Brien), published under the pseudonym "Myles na gCopaleen".  It is widely regarded as one of the greatest Irish-language novels of the 20th century. An English translation by Patrick C. Power appeared in 1973.  Stan Gebler Davies wrote:  "The Poor Mouth is wildly funny, but there is at the same time always a sense of black evil.  Only O'Brien's genius, of all the writers I can think of, was capable of that mixture of qualities."

Background
The book is a kindly parody of the genre of Gaeltacht autobiographies, such as Tomás Ó Criomhthain's autobiography  (The Islandman), or Peig Sayers' autobiography Peig, which recounts her life, especially the latter half, as a series of misfortunes in which much of her family die by disease, drowning or other mishap. Books of this genre were part of the Irish language syllabus in the Irish school system and so were mandatory reading for generations of children from independence in 1921. O'Nolan was in fact a great admirer of An t-Oileánach, which is widely regarded as being the greatest work of the genre, but critic Declan Kiberd has noted how O'Nolan's admiration for a writer tended to express itself as parody of the writer's work.

The Irish expression "to put on the poor mouth" is mildly pejorative and refers to the practice, often associated with peasant farmers, of exaggerating the direness of one's situation, particularly financially, to evoke sympathy, charity and perhaps the forbearance of creditors and landlords or generosity of customers. The title may also be a parody  of that of the Irish language reader An Saol Mór (The Great Life) (in Irish, béal and saol are near-rhymes). The title is, perhaps, more likely to be a parody on 'An Béal Beo' (The Living Tongue) by Tomas Ó Máille, published by An Gúm in 1936.

All of O'Nolan's other novels were published under the pseudonym Flann O'Brien; it is the only one for which he used the "Myles na gCopaleen" pseudonym that he was then using for his celebrated Irish Times column Cruiskeen Lawn. (Subsequently, O'Nolan altered the newspaper byline slightly to the more anglicised "Myles na Gopaleen".) Neither is a real Irish surname, however. Both derive from a character named Myles-na-Coppaleen in Dion Boucicault's 1860 play The Colleen Bawn, which, in turn, comes from the Irish , "of the little horses".

Plot 

It is a memoir of one Bónapárt Ó Cúnasa (Bonaparte O'Coonassa), a resident of this region, beginning at his very birth. However, they eventually abandon the area because the poverty is too impoverished, the cultural authenticity is too culturally authentic, and because the dialect of the Irish-language spoken in Corca Dhorcha is far too Irish. The narrator, after a series of bloodcurdling and horrible adventures, is eventually imprisoned on a false murder charge, and there, "safe in jail and free from the miseries of life", finally has the chance to write this most affecting memoir of our times.

Play
It was also part of The University Drama Festival in Galway in February 1967. On Wednesday, 26 July 1967 the play opened in The Peacock Theatre, Dublin and was the very first production in the theatre. It ran for only three days and closed abruptly. Due to a disagreement between Brian O'Nualain's widow and the book publishers The Abbey Theatre decided to pull the play.

The book was adapted for stage by Paul Lee and first presented in the pub , Charlemont Street, Dublin, for the Dublin Theatre Festival in 1989, directed by Ronan Smith.

Film and Graphic Novel
The artwork was done by John McCloskey, whose graphic novel version based on Collins' screenplay was published in 2012 by Cló Mhaigh Eo.

Notes

References
 na gCopaleen, Myles, An Béal Bocht, Third Edition, Dolmen Press, Dublin, 1964. 
  .

External links
 Gaelically Gaelic, essay featuring excerpts 
 Markus, Radvan (2018). “The Prison of Language: Brian O’Nolan, An Béal Bocht, and Language Determinism.” The Parish Review 4.1: 29–38. available in open access

1941 novels
Novels set in Ireland
Novels by Flann O'Brien
Irish-language literature
Irish novels adapted into films
Irish novels adapted into plays